Saint-Crépin-Ibouvillers is a commune in the Oise department in northern France. The village is located along the A16 Highspeed road (L'Isle-Adam to Bray-Dunes), 5 km from Méru (with regular train connections to Paris and Beauvais) and 28 km away from Beauvais-Tillé Airport. It absorbed the former commune Montherlant in January 2015. The municipality has a population of 1,548 as of 2018.

Saint-Crépin-Ibouvillers is known for its 13th-century church, a listed monument since 1932.

See also
 Communes of the Oise department

References

Communes of Oise

Communes nouvelles of Oise